Bankend railway station served Bankend, a village in South Lanarkshire, Scotland. It closed in 1926 and the area became an opencast coal mine.

References

Disused railway stations in South Lanarkshire
Railway stations in Great Britain closed in 1926
Former Caledonian Railway stations